St James' Parish Church is a 19th-century parish church of the Church of Scotland in the Pollok area of Glasgow.

History
The church was originally built as the Titwood Parish Church of Pollokshields, but was dismantled, transported and rebuilt in Pollok between 1951 and 1953, and then renamed St James'. The church was originally built between 1893 and 1895 in Glencairn Drive, Pollokshields. It was built in the Neo-Gothic cruciform style, designed by Henry Edward Clifford. Thomson, McCrea and Sanders were the architects responsible for the dismantling and rebuilding of the church in a different location. Prior to the move, the Titwood congregation had united with the Pollokshields congregation in 1941, rending the former Titwood Parish Church redundant. During the rebuilding, the new Pollok congregation, worshipped in a school hall and then in a wooden hut. The church was reopened on 3 September 1953.

References

Churches completed in 1895
James
Listed churches in Glasgow
Category B listed buildings in Glasgow
1893 establishments in Scotland
19th-century Church of Scotland church buildings
Pollokshields
Relocated buildings and structures in the United Kingdom